D'Acquisto is the surname of:

 John D'Acquisto (born 1951), American former Major League Baseball pitcher
 Mario D'Acquisto, president of Sicily from 1980 to 1982 - see List of presidents of Sicily
 Salvo D'Acquisto (1920–1943), member of the Italian Carabinieri who sacrificed himself to save 22 civilians from execution
 Bronte D'Acquisto, Big Brother contestant